The 2008 Texas Tech Red Raiders football team represented Texas Tech University as a member of the Big 12 Conference during the 2008 NCAA Division I FBS football season. Led by ninth-year head coach Mike Leach, the Red Raiders compiled an overall record of 11–2 with a mark of 7–1 in conference play, finishing in a three-way tie with Oklahoma and Texas atop the Big 12 South Division standing. To break the tie, the Bowl Championship Series BCS rankings were used to determine who would face Missouri in Big 12 Championship Game. Oklahoma, ranked No. 2 in the BCS poll, was chosen to represent the South Division in the game. Texas Tech was invited to the Cotton Bowl Classic, where they lost to Ole Miss.
The Red Raiders played home games at Jones AT&T Stadium in Lubbock, Texas.

In a 2013 poll, the 2008 team was voted as the second best team in Texas Tech football history, losing to the 1973 team by a margin of 53.2% to 46.8%.

Preseason

Rankings

Sports Illustrated'''s Stewart Mandel has Tech ranked at #10 in his preseason poll and later #8 in his college football power rankings. The team is also ranked #10 in the preseason by Fox Sports. ESPN.com writer Mark Schlabach ranked the Red Raiders #12 in his preseason poll and later #11 and #8 in revised editions of his preseason polls. In a March 26, 2008 article, Yahoo! Sports writer Olin Buchanan declared that Tech could challenge Oklahoma and Texas for supremacy in the Big 12 South in 2008. As plusses, he cited a strong quarterback (Graham Harrell), experienced wide receivers (including Michael Crabtree), and five returning starters on the offensive line. As a weakness, he mentioned the defense's trouble stopping the run but speculated that a year of experience and new talent may help to alleviate this problem. Another weak spot he pointed out was the Red Raiders' trouble moving the ball on the ground on those rare instances when a rushing play is called.

Texas Tech was ranked #14 in the preseason USA Today Coaches' Poll, their highest ever preseason ranking since the 1977 season when they came in at #8. The Associated Press's preseason poll put the team at #12.

Dave Campbell's Texas Football

Coach Mike Leach, along with players Graham Harrell and Michael Crabtree were featured on the cover of the 2008 edition of Dave Campbell's Texas Football. The magazine predicted that the 2008 Red Raider football team would be the best in Texas and would challenge for the Big 12 South title.

Personnel changes
On January 22, 2008, Ruffin McNeill was hired as the team's defensive coordinator. He had held the position in an interim capacity since Lyle Setencich was reassigned during the previous season. After McNeill took over from Setencich, the Red Raiders' numbers for the 2007 season improved in all areas: rushing defense per game (198.1 to 157.1), passing defense per game (206.8 to 190.8), scoring defense per game (28.2 to 24.5), opponent first downs per game (22.5 to 19.9), and opponent third-down conversions per game (47.8% to 39.3%). For the McNeill-coached games, Tech's average yield of 347.9 yards was the lowest allowed in the Big 12 Conference, and the scoring defense was fourth-best in the conference for that time frame.

On February 1, 2008, offensive coordinator Dana Holgorsen resigned his position with the Red Raiders. He announced that he had been hired to the same position with the Houston Cougars.

Schedule

Roster

Player awardsSorted alphabetically by last name.

Game summaries

Eastern Washington

The Tulsa Golden Hurricane were scheduled to travel to Lubbock for this game but backed out of the deal, choosing to play the Arkansas Razorbacks instead. During the previous season, the Eagles made it to the quarterfinals of the FCS playoffs before being defeated, 38–35, by three-time defending national champion Appalachian State. They came into the game ranked #7 in the FCS. Texas Tech came in with a #14 ranking in the FBS.

The Eagles won the coin toss and opted to receive the ball. On the first play after kickoff, Matt Nichols's pass was intercepted by Tech's Brian Duncan. The resulting drive ended in a two-yard rushing touchdown by Shannon Woods, followed by successful point after try by Donnie Corona. The Red Raiders scored twice more in the first quarter while shutting out the Eagles to bring the score to 21–0.

Eastern Washington was able to respond in the second quarter by scoring two touchdowns and a field goal. Meanwhile, Texas Tech was held to a single touchdown with successful PAT. Going into halftime, the score stood at 28–17 in favor of the Red Raiders.

In the third quarter, both Eastern Washington and Texas Tech added seven points. In the final quarter, the Red Raiders extended their lead when Aaron Crawford and Baron Batch both scored rushing touchdowns to bring the final score to 49–24.

During the game, the Red Raiders rushed 25 time for a total of 103 yards. Quarterback Graham Harrell completed 43 out of 58 pass attempts for 536 yards, two touchdowns and was intercepted once. He was named AT&T ESPN All-America Player of the Week for his performance.  The team had a school record 18 penalties for 169 yards.

at Nevada

The Red Raiders started off with the ball to begin the game. After failing to get a first down on the first three plays, Texas Tech decided to go for it on fourth down in Nevada territory and failed to make it. On the ensuing Nevada drive, the Wolf Pack successfully kicked a field goal giving them the lead, 0–3. On the next drive by Texas Tech, Graham Harrell's pass was intercepted by Uche Anyanwu. The next Nevada drive stalled on a three-and-out. Nevada was forced to punt to Eric Morris who took it 86 yards for a touchdown, giving the Red Raiders the lead, 7–3. Texas Tech and Nevada failed to score on their next drives with Nevada missing a field goal with a few minutes remaining in the first quarter.

In the second quarter, Nevada's only points came from a field goal. Texas Tech drove 68 yards on five plays and scored on a one-yard run by Shannon Woods. The key play was a 50-yard pass from Harrell to Michael Crabtree who ran it all the way to the one-yard line. On the next Nevada drive, defensive end Brandon Williams tipped a pass which landed in the hands of defensive tackle Richard Jones. Both teams went scoreless the rest of the half. Nevada received the kickoff to begin the second half and immediately drove the field. Nevada's quarterback Colin Kaepernick dove into the endzone in what appeared to be a touchdown. However, after a lengthy review, the officials agreed that Texas Tech's Daniel Charbonnet forced the ball out of Kaepernick's hands resulting in a touchback. The next Red Raider drive, Mike Leach decided to go for a first down on fourth down, which they failed to make again. Nevada's resulting drive stalled, but they were able to kick a field goal due to good field position after the failed fourth down attempt. The only other points in the third quarter came on Texas Tech's next drive of six plays and 39 yards, scoring on Eric Morris' 13-yard run giving the Red Raiders the lead, 21–12.

Harrell was intercepted to begin fourth quarter and the resulting Nevada drive went three-and-out. On the next drive, Harrell and Crabtree connected for another big play, this one resulting in 82-yards and a touchdown giving Texas Tech a 28–12 lead. Texas Tech's celebration did not last long, as on the very next drive Nevada's Kaepernick passed for the team's only touchdown, a 48-yard pass to Marko Mitchell to make the score 28–19 in favor of Texas Tech. The Red Raiders scored on their very next drive on a 21-yard run by Woods with 6:18 remaining. The next Nevada drive resulted in a turnover on downs and the Red Raiders held on to the ball and the win, 35–19.

The story of the game was Texas Tech's defense, not the offense. So much so, that as the Red Raiders were walking off the field, Texas Tech fans in attendance chanted, "De-fense! De-fense!" Although they allowed 488 total yards, the defense held the Wolf Pack to four field goals in six red zone attempts. Harrell, after being named Player of the Week last week against Eastern Washington, went 19 of 46 (41.3%) and 297 yards with one touchdown and two interceptions and set a career low in completions and completion percentage. There has been only two other times in Harrell's career in which he had completed less than 60 percent of his passes. This is the first time Texas Tech has won one of those games. Michael Crabtree had 7 catches for 158 yards and one touchdown.

Nevada's place kicker Brett Jaekle went 4 of 6 on field goals from distances of 27, 26, 43, and 31 yards. Nevada quarterback Kaepernick had a huge game going 24 of 35 for 264 yards, one touchdown, and one interception. He was also the team's leading rusher, gaining 92 yards on 17 carries.

SMU

The Mustangs received the kickoff to begin the game. On the first play from scrimmage, SMU quarterback Bo Levi Mitchell's pass was intercepted by Daniel Charbonnet. Tech's following offensive drive ended in a Donnie Carona 35-yard field goal. The Red Raiders scored twice more in the first quarter. The first on a 43-yard rush by Baron Batch, followed by failed Carona point-after try. The second on a 23-yard pass from Graham Harrell to Michael Crabtree, followed by failed two-point conversion. Tech scored once in the second quarter to bring the score to 22–0 at the half.

In the second half, the Red Raiders scored three more times before putting in backup personnel.

The Mustangs only score of the game came with 3:29 remaining when Logan Turner passed to Aldrick Robinson for a seven-yard touchdown, followed by a successful Thomas Morstead PAT.

Texas Tech safety Daniel Charbonnet had a school-record three interceptions and was later named Big 12 Defensive Player of the Week.

UMass

During the first quarter, the Red Raiders scored three touchdowns, followed by successful point after tries. The Minutemen scored once, on a 53-yard return of a Texas Tech fumble. The Red Raiders scored three times in the second quarter while shutting out the Minutemen. The score going into the half stood at 42–7.

Tech's first score of the third quarter came when Darcel Mcbath returned an interception 45 yards for a touchdown. Their second score was an 18-yard rushing touchdown by Shannon Woods. At the end of the third period of play, Texas Tech led 56–7. The only score by either team in the fourth quarter was a 2-yard rush by UMass's Korrey Davis with 51 seconds remaining on the game clock. The final score was 56–14 in favor of the Red Raiders.

During the game, Texas Tech's Graham Harrell completed 27 of 34 passes for 322 yards. Backup quarterback Taylor Potts was 4 of 9 for 37 yards. The Red Raiders had a total of 359 yards passing with 11 players catching passes. They also had 179 yards combined rushing from 5 different players.

at Kansas State

Coming into the game, K-State had lost the last 3 of 4 to the Red Raiders. Their last win against Texas Tech was in 2000 in Manhattan, Kansas. Texas Tech was favored by seven.

The Red Raiders scored first, on a 1-yard pass from Graham Harrell to Lyle Leong. The Wildcats responded by scoring on the following drive on a 33-yard TD pass to Ernie Pierce. Texas Tech made another touchdown, followed by successful PAT, to bring the score to 14–7. Facing fourth-and-inches from their own 29 late in the first quarter, the Red Raiders sent Shannon Woods on a sweep. But he was stopped and, four plays later, Kansas State quarterback Josh Freeman scored on a 1-yard run, bringing the score to 14–14. A moment later, Texas Tech's Richard Jones recovered Lamark Brown's fumble on the Kansas State 34 and Baron Batch capped the ensuing drive with a 9-yard touchdown run on the following play to make the score 58–21.

On successive possessions in the second quarter, Harrell led quick-hitting drives of 53-, 70-, and 54-yards. Freeman, however, misfired on 9 of 10 passes, several of which Tech defenders got their hands on. The Kansas State junior, who a week earlier had become his own school's career passing leader, was 13-for-28 for 170 yards. Ernie Pierce scored on an 18-yard return of a blocked punt late in the game.

K-State's defense gave up 626 yards in the game. It was the third consecutive game that the Wildcats gave up more than 600 yards on defense. Graham Harrell threw six touchdown passes, matching his single-game career best. During the game, he also broke the school passing-yards record of 12,429 yard set by Kliff Kingsbury from 1999 to 2002. For his performance, Harrell was also named Big 12 Conference Offensive Player of the Week as well as the O'Brien Quarterback of the Week.

Lyle Leong snared three touchdown passes from Harrell, who was 38-for-51 for 454 yards. Texas Tech scored on seven straight possessions and did not attempt a punt until Taylor Potts replaced Harrell late in the fourth quarter. Heisman candidate Michael Crabtree had nine catches for 107 yards and two TDs. With six, Harrell tied his career-best for touchdown passes, getting the ball to ten different receivers.

Nebraska

For homecoming, Texas Tech hosted the Nebraska Cornhuskers. Coming into the game, the Cornhuskers led the all-time series with Texas Tech, 7–2. However, the Red Raiders had won the previous two games. At Texas Tech's 2004 homecoming, they dealt Nebraska their worst loss in school history, 70–10. The following year, the Red Raiders won, 34–31, in Lincoln. This was Nebraska's first loss at their own homecoming in 37 years.

To begin the game, both the Red Raiders and Cornhuskers were forced to punt. On Texas Tech's next drive, Graham Harrell connected with Michael Crabtree on a 35-yard pass for the only score in the first quarter. This touchdown gave Crabtree the most touchdown receptions in school history. On the ensuing Nebraska drive, Quentin Castille scored on a 4-yard run and tied the game at 7–7. Texas Tech's Donnie Carona successfully kicked a 26-yard field goal on the Red Raider's next drive. After forcing a Nebraska turnover on downs, Shannon Woods gave Texas Tech a 17–7 lead on a 4-yard run. Nebraska later missed a field goal to end the half.

Nebraska began with the ball in the second half and drove 75 yards and scored on an Alex Henery 21-yard field goal. On the ensuing Texas Tech drive, Harrell again found Crabtree in the end zone this time on a 4-yard pass. Texas Tech had the lead 24–10 to end the third quarter.

To begin the fourth quarter, the Texas Tech defense forced a Nebraska fourth down and 1 in field goal range. The Cornhuskers brought out the kicker but faked the field goal and passed for a first down to the 1-yard line. Nebraska's Joe Ganz then scored on a 1-yard quarterback sneak to pull Nebraska within 7 points with 12:10 remaining in the fourth quarter. After a Red Raider punt, the Cornhuskers once again drove the field and scored on a Ganz 2-yard pass to Dreu Young to tie the game at 24–24. On the very next drive by Texas Tech, the Cornhuskers forced the Red Raiders to a fourth down with 5 yards to go on Texas Tech's own 36-yard line. Mike Leach decided to go for it, and Harrell found Crabtree again for a 47-yard reception keeping the drive alive. Harrell later said of the play, "If he was just a little covered, I would go to him. I threw it up there and he made the play." A few plays later, Harrell scored on a 1-yard run to give the Red Raiders the lead 31–24. Nebraska then drove the field 79 yards in 8 plays and scored on a 17-yard pass from Ganz to Todd Peterson to tie the game at 31 a piece with 29 seconds remaining in the game. Texas Tech failed to score on the next drive and the game went into overtime.

In overtime, Texas Tech received the ball first. The Red Raiders utilized a screen pass to running back Baron Batch to the 1-yard line. Harrell then handed the ball to Eric Morris for a 1-yard touchdown run. On the extra point, however, Carona's kick was partially blocked which kept the score difference at 6, 37–31. On Nebraska's first overtime try, Ganz's pass was intercepted by cornerback Jamar Wall after Ganz tried to throw the ball away to avoid being sacked. This interception gave Texas Tech the win preserving their top-10 ranking.

Harrell's two touchdown passes to Crabtree gave the tandem the most touchdown connections by a quarterback-receiver combination in Big 12 Conference history with 32. Harrell ended the game completing 20 of his 25 passes for 284 yards and two touchdowns. Crabtree caught 5 passes for 89 yards and 2 touchdowns. Running back Baron Batch rushed 10 times for 89 yards.

Nebraska's Joe Ganz completed 36 of his 44 passes for 349 yards, two touchdowns, and one interception. The Cornhuskers held the ball for 40 minutes and 12 seconds in contrast to Texas Tech's 19 minutes and 48 seconds.

at Texas A&M

Although, before the game, the Texas A&M Aggies led the all-time series with the Red Raiders, 34–31–1, they have not beaten Texas Tech since an overtime victory at Kyle Field in 2004. Mike Leach had a 6–2 record versus the Aggies. Sports bettors favor Tech to win by 21 points.

The Aggies scored first on a 46-yard Randy Bullock field goal. The Red Raiders were able to answer with a touchdown to take the lead. However, A&M responded with a touchdown of their own, bringing the score to 10–7 in their favor. Thirty-nine seconds into the second quarter, Tech's Baron Batch scored on a three-yard run but the point after try was blocked. The Aggies scored two more field goals before the Red Raiders scored on an eight-yard pass from Graham Harrell to Baron Batch. Cory Fowler's extra point was good and Tech held a 20–16 advantage before A&M scored another touchdown to take a 20–23 halftime lead.

In the third quarter, Texas Tech scored a touchdown and a field goal while holding A&M scoreless. Going into the final period of play, the Red Raiders led 30–23. With seven minutes remaining in the game, Texas Tech scored on a one-yard run by Graham Harrell. The extra point was blocked by Texas A&M and returned 97 yards by Arkeith Brown for the Aggies' final score of the game. The Red Raiders added one more touchdown to bring the final score to 43–25.

at Kansas

Texas Tech placekicker Matt Williams made his debut during the game. Williams came to the attention of Coach Mike Leach when he kicked a 30-yard field goal during a halftime contest at the game versus UMass. Following Tech's victory over Kansas, Williams was recognized as the AT&T ESPN All-America Player of the Week.

Texas

The series between Texas Tech and Texas originated in Austin in 1928 and the two teams have met annually since 1960. Texas led the series 43–14 entering the game, with the Red Raiders last win coming in a 42–38 upset of the #3 Longhorns in Lubbock in 2002. In the 2006 contest, #5 Texas narrowly came away with a 35–31 win over an unranked Texas Tech team at Jones AT&T Stadium. In the 2007 game, #14 Texas won 59–43.

On the day of the game, ESPN's College GameDay'' broadcast from Lubbock for the first time.

Oklahoma State

Texas Tech and Oklahoma State first played in 1935. Coming into the game, the Red Raiders led the series over the Cowboys, 20–12–3. Oklahoma State last won in 2007 in Stillwater, 49–45, in a game that came down to the final possession. However, the Cowboys had not won in Lubbock since 1944. Texas Tech would not defeat Oklahoma State again until the 2018 season.

at Oklahoma

Texas Tech and Oklahoma first played in 1992. Coming into the game, the Sooners led the series 11–4–0 though the Red Raiders had won 2 of the last 3 with the last loss coming in Norman in 2006. The only road game Tech had won in the series was during the inaugural season of the Big 12 in 1996. Under head coach Bob Stoops, the Sooners had lost only two games at home. The Sooners are 7-point favorites.

The Red Raiders opened the game with a kickoff return to their 32-yard line. The Sooners forced a punt, and fielded their offense at their 27. The Sooners scored a touchdown with 8:59 left in the first. DeMarco Murray contributed 48 rushing yards in the drive. Tech returned the ensuing kickoff to their 22, and a Sooner personal foul after the return gave the Red Raiders 15 yards. Texas Tech lost 10 of those yards due to a delay of game and a false start. Starting at their 27, the Red Raiders were stopped at the Oklahoma 48, where they punted again. The Sooners got the ball on their 20. On the second play of the drive, Oklahoma was punished again with a 15-yard penalty. After three failed attempts to pass the ball for a first down, the Sooners elected to make their first punt. On the next Tech possession, Graham Harrell was sacked on two consecutive plays, once by Adrian Taylor and the other by Gerald McCoy. Coming into the game, the Red Raiders ranked second in the nation in sacks allowed, with only 5. The Sooners ended the first quarter with a 42-yard reception by tight end Jermaine Gresham and two rushes by Chris Brown for a combined 12 yards.

Once the second quarter commenced, both Brown and Gresham moved the ball for a touchdown on three different plays. Tech started their next drive at their own 38 and advanced the ball through the air to eventually get to the Oklahoma 15. Two incompletions caused the Red Raiders to face a 4th-and-3. Tech decided to go for it. Woods was unable to catch a pass by Harrell to convert and Tech turned the ball over on downs. Murray rushed the ball for 23 yards on Oklahoma's first play of the drive. Murray followed with a 31-yard reception, which put the ball on the Tech 30. After two rushes by Brown, Gresham scored a touchdown on a 19-yard catch, and the subsequent extra point extended the Sooners lead to 21–0. Oklahoma's defense forced Tech to four plays on the next drive, with the fourth play being a 4th-and-4, Tech's second 4th down conversion attempt. With 9:31 remaining, Oklahoma completed a 1:44 scoring drive, which was capped by Juaquin Iglesias' 28-yard scoring reception. On the following possession, the Red Raiders reached the end zone, thanks to Harrell's 25-yard throw to Tramain Swindall. Matt Williams' extra point brought the score to 28–7. With 6:28 left in the half, Oklahoma began to drain the clock using their running game. The Sooners eventually scored on the 12th play of the drive. Once Tech got the ball, about a minute was left on the clock. On the second play, Harrell threw an interception to Travis Lewis, who returned the ball 47 yards. Tech offensive guard Brandon Carter, who stopped Lewis at the Tech 1, received a personal foul. Murray scored on a 1-yard rush to increase the Sooners' lead to 42–7. Tech got the ball again after the Sooner touchdown with 18 seconds remaining in the game. Harrell threw a shovel pass to Baron Batch, who ran 21 yards to the Tech 28. The half ended with Tech receiving a 16-yard personal foul. The Red Raiders left the field facing their biggest deficit of the season (35 points).

Tech attempted an onside kick to start off the second half, though the Sooners grabbed the ball at the Tech 34. OU ended the drive on a 33-yard field goal. Tech fumbled on their next possession, Oklahoma's Keenan Clayton recovered the fumble and return it 53 yards to the Tech 3. The Sooners added another 7 points to extend their lead to 52–7. Tech cranked up its passing game on its next possession, eventually scoring a touchdown and extra point with 5:39 remaining in the third quarter. On the subsequent drive, the Red Raider defense forced their first sack on Bradford, and also forced the Sooners to punt. The Sooner defense countered in the next drive by forcing a three-and-out. The Sooner offense then added another score on a 66-yard reception by Manuel Johnson. The Tech defense blocked the extra point, and the score remained at 58–14.

In the fourth quarter, Tech failed to convert another fourth down, producing another turnover. Oklahoma scored immediately afterwards, improving their lead to 65–14. On the next possession, Tech was able to make three pass completions of at least 12 yards, though on the final play of the drive, Harrell lost the ball to the Sooners on a sack. With 10:50 left in the game, the Sooners started to run out the clock. The Red Raiders stopped them from scoring on a 4th down from the 1. Tech got the ball back with 4:48 on the clock. After a few plays, Tech faced another 4th down, and this time was able to convert it with a 13-yard throw to Crabtree. Tech later score their third touchdown with 11 seconds left, and Williams tacked on the extra point to change the score to 65–21. Tech attempted an onside kick and recovered the ball. The final play was a short-yard catch by Woods.

Since the Sooners won, Tech, Texas, and OU all tied for first in the division at 6–1. All three teams won their regular season finales to tie again at 7–1, the highest ranked team in the BCS standings earned a spot in the Big 12 Championship game. Sports columnists also stated that the quarterback of the winning team would be the front runner for the Heisman Trophy.

Baylor

Two of Tech's starters on the secondary were unable to play in the game. Tech scored on the first possession of the game. The Bears countered on the ensuing drive, in which they scored on a 1-yard quarterback sneak by Robert Griffin. On the next drive, Harrell's pass got intercepted on third down, and Antonio Johnson returned the interception for four yards to the Tech 34. After a few plays, Griffin soon scored a 13-yard rushing touchdown. Baylor's kicker Ben Parks missed the extra point, keeping the Baylor lead at 13–7 by the end of the first quarter.

At the start of the second quarter, the Tech offensive line gave up another sack on Harrell, which cost them 10 yards. The Red Raiders, however, were able to complete the drive with a touchdown to regain their lead at 14–13. On the second to last play of the drive, Michael Crabtree injured his right ankle with about four minutes left in the half. Crabtree's right ankle twisted as he got tackled while making a 6-yard reception at the Baylor 1-yard line. Crabtree hobbled to the Tech bench, and was later taken to the locker room on a cart. He did not return for the second half.  Baylor was forced to kick a field goal on their next possession, though Parks missed it from 29 yards. Once Tech got the ball back again, Harrell got sacked on the second play of the drive, and lost the ball in the process. Baylor recovered the fumble and fielded their offense at the Tech 16. Griffin led his team to another scoring drive, which ended on a successful two-point conversion. Baylor left the field leading 21–14 at halftime.

The Bears opened the third quarter with a 9-play 78-yard offensive drive that produced another touchdown. The longest play was running back Jay Finley's 47-yard rush. On their next drive, the Red Raiders scored again, though still trailed 28–14. Early on in the drive, Antonio Johnson sacked Harrell and forced a fumble, but running back Baron Batch was able to recover the fumble.

The Red Raiders compiled 7 points with 12:20 remaining in the game. On Baylor's next drive, Tech intercepted the ball at the Baylor 38. They soon converted the interception into a touchdown. On Baylor's final possession, which lasted 5 plays, Griffin was sacked twice. The second sack occurred on a fourth down, which caused the Bears to turn the ball over on downs. Tech ran out the clock and preserved their 35–28 victory.

vs. Ole Miss (Cotton Bowl Classic)

The Red Raiders were defeated by the Ole Miss Rebels in the 2009 AT&T Cotton Bowl Classic in Dallas, Texas on January 2, 2009. The Red Raiders and the Rebels have met in bowl games twice before: the 1986 Independence Bowl and the 1998 Independence Bowl, with Ole Miss winning both. The teams also met during the 2002 and 2003 regular seasons with Texas Tech winning both games of the home-and-home series.

Rankings

Statistics

Team

Scores by quarter

See also

 2008 Big 12 Conference South Division 3-way tie controversy

References

Texas Tech
Texas Tech Red Raiders football seasons
Texas Tech Red Raiders football